Leptobrachium montanum is a species of frog from the family Megophryidae. It is endemic to Borneo and is, as currently defined, found in Kalimantan (Indonesia), Sabah and Sarawak (Malaysia), and Labi, Belait (Brunei). However, the nominal Leptobrachium montanum is a composed of more than one lineage. Available information mostly refers to this composite rather than the "true" Leptobrachium montanum. Common names montane large-eyed litter frog, mountain spadefoot toad, and mountain litter frog have been coined for it.

Description
Two adult males and four females representing "Leptobrachium montanum lineage 1" measure  and females  SVL, respectively. This lineage from southeastern Kalimantan is believed to represent the "true" Leptobrachium montanum. The dorsum is brown above, mimicking dead leaves. The head is broad. The eyes are big.

male advertisement call is a loud "quak".

The tadpoles are large and possess a strong tail with well-developed tail fin.

Habitat and conservation
While adults and juveniles can roam widely through forests, breeding takes place in small to medium-sized mountain streams with rocky stream bed. The tadpoles prefer quiet stream sections.

Leptobrachium montanum is threatened by habitat loss and fragmentation. It occurs in many protected areas.

References

External links
 Sound recordings of Leptobrachium montanum at BioAcoustica

montanum
Endemic fauna of Borneo
Amphibians of Brunei
Amphibians of Indonesia
Amphibians of Malaysia
Taxa named by Johann Gustav Fischer
Amphibians described in 1885
Taxonomy articles created by Polbot
Amphibians of Borneo